Ghufayla Prayer (Arabic: صلاة الغفیلة) is a famous Nafl Salah (supererogatory prayer) which consists of two Rakats that is done between Maghrib and Isha prayers as a Mustahab (recommended) prayer.

The word "ghufayla" is the diminutive noun of "ghaflah" (neglect) and it means small neglect. There are hadiths which mention this Salah as an efficient prayer in the requests of people from Allah being responded to and likewise person's sins being forgiven by Him.

Narrations
It is said from Ja'far al-Sadiq (the six Imam of Shia Islam) that he quoted from Muhammad al-Baqir that the Islamic prophet, Muhammad said about this recommended prayer that "say prayer in the time of neglect, although it is two Rakats, these two Rakats enter (you) in the paradise; it was asked Muhammad in a similar hadith that "when is the time of neglect?", then he answered "it is between Maghrib and Isha". According to another narration, Ja'far al-Sadiq quoted from the Prophet Muhammad that he said: Do not leave two Rakats of Ghufayla prayer which is between Maghrib and Isha.

Method
The circumstances of Ghufayla prayer is as follows:

In the first Rakat, after Surah al-Hamd, (instead of any other Surah), these verses ought to be recited: 

In the 2nd rak'at of the prayer, after Surah al-Hamd, this dua/verse is recited (instead of other Surah): '
And in Qunut this dua is recited:  (At this part, the reciter ought to mention his/her wishes beginning).

Afterwards, this dua ought to be recited: Ghafaylah Salah bza.org.uk Retrieved 23 June 2018

See also
Al Ghaffar
Al-Afuw

References

External links
Ghufayla Prayers Info
Salah Times Information

Salah
Prayer
Shia Islam
Salah terminology